The Bernd Theodor Matthias Prize is a science award for innovative contributions to the material aspects of superconductivity.

Summary
Bernd Theodor Matthias Prize is presented since 1989 by the Bell Labs, created by friends and colleagues of prof. Bernd T. Matthias.

Since 2000, the Prize has been sponsored by the Texas Center for Superconductivity at the University of Houston. The Prize consists of $5,000 USD and a special framed certificate.

List of laureates

References

See also
Bernd T. Matthias

American science and technology awards